Mastax elegantula is a species of beetle in the family Carabidae with restricted distribution in India and Myanmar.

References

Mastax elegantula
Beetles described in 1846
Beetles of Asia